The Marrakech Palmeraie Open was a women's professional golf tournament on the Ladies European Tour that took place at Palmeraie Golf Palace in Marrakech, Morocco.

Winners

References

External links
Ladies European Tour

Former Ladies European Tour events
Golf tournaments in Morocco